Aghaiani  is a village in Kaspi District, Shida Kartli, Georgia. It is located on Mukhrani plain, on the right bank of the river Ksani, at an altitude of 540 meters. It is 22 kilometers from Kaspi. According to the 2014 census, 1505 people reside in the village.

The historical sources first mention the village in 1459. In 1625 near the village a battle took place between Kakhetians and Persians. In the surroundings of the village archaeologists discovered the remnants of settlements from the Bronze and Antic periods. Two km southeast of the village, on Mt. Tkhoti, stands the Aghaiani church of Saint Nino.

See also
 Shida Kartli

References 
 GSE, (1977) volume 2, page 46, Tbilisi.

Populated places in Shida Kartli